The Maltese Second and Third Division Knock-Out was a football competition contested by teams playing in the Maltese Second and Third Division. The format consisted of the teams being drawn into eight groups, with the winners of each group progressing to the knockout phase of the competition.

Winners 

 
Knock-Out
Knock-Out